Human instinct may refer to:

 Instinct in humans
 Human nature, a related concept
 The Human Instinct, a New Zealand rock band